In Canada, England, and Wales, certain convicted persons may be designated as dangerous offenders and subject to a longer, or indefinite, term of imprisonment in order to protect the public. Other countries, including Denmark and parts of the United States have similar provisions of law.

Worldwide

Canada
In Canadian criminal law, a convicted person who is designated a dangerous offender may be subjected to an indeterminate prison sentence, whether or not the crime carries a life sentence. This does not apply to convictions of first degree murder, second degree murder, high treason, and treason. The purpose of the legislation is to detain offenders who are deemed too dangerous to be released into society because of their violent tendencies, but whose sentences would not necessarily keep them incarcerated under other legislation, such as the Correctional and Conditional Release Act. Under subsection 761(1) of the Criminal Code, the Parole Board of Canada is required to review the case of an offender with a dangerous offender label after seven years, and parole may be granted as circumstances warrant, but the offender would remain under supervision indefinitely. After the initial review, the Parole Board must conduct subsequent reviews every two years. According to Corrections Canada, on average 24 dangerous offenders are admitted to the Canadian prison system each year. Paul Bernardo is one well-known dangerous offender.

The dangerous offender provisions have been found constitutional: "The individual, on a finding of guilty, is being sentenced for the 'serious personal injury offence' for which he was convicted, albeit in a different way than would ordinarily be done. He is not being punished for what he might do. The punishment flows from the actual commission of a specific offence."

On 17 October 2006, the Canadian government introduced legislation that made it easier for Crown prosecutors to obtain dangerous offender designations. The amendments provide, among other things, that an offender found guilty of a third conviction of a designated violent or sexual offence must prove that he or she does not qualify as a dangerous offender. This legislation was passed in 2008. Under previous legislation, the Crown had to prove that the individual qualified as a dangerous offender. The amendment  reverses the onus for individuals convicted of three violent offences. Such individuals must now demonstrate to a court that despite the three convictions, they should not be designated as dangerous offenders.

It is difficult for those classified as dangerous offenders to be granted parole. As of April 2012, there were 486 active offenders with the Dangerous Offender (DO) designation.  Of the 486 active DO's at that time, 466 (or about 96%) were incarcerated. DO's constitute about 3% of the federal offender population.

Canadian courts also have the option of designating convicts "long term offenders". A hearing is held after sentencing, and, if a judge rules the accused is likely to re-offend after release, a 10-year period of community supervision is required after the sentence is completed.

Denmark

In Denmark, offenders who commit dangerous crimes, such as murder, arson, assault, rape, child molestation or robbery may receive a "custody sentence", which lacks a definite time period. This sentence is often bestowed on offenders with deviant personalities (for example, antisocial personality disorder). The detainees are typically housed in the Institution of Herstedvester. There are periodic pardoning reviews and on average the offenders serve 14 years and 7 months before being released.

England and Wales
In England and Wales, the sentencing of dangerous offenders is governed by the Sentencing Act 2020.

United States
In the United States, "Dangerous offender" statutes are defined on a state-by-state basis and are applied at sentencing such that the enhanced "dangerous offender" sentence stems from the original illegal activity. A person under "dangerous offender" sentencing is typically held for a minimum term that coincides with the sentence the person would have received without the "dangerous offender" sentence, and thereafter is subject to review of the person's state of mind as a determination of eligibility for release.

Alternatively, a person can be civilly committed if a judicial hearing determines that a concurrent mental disorder makes the person likely to remain dangerous because of a lack of self-control. This issue arose in the case of sex offenders  in Kansas v. Hendricks (1997) in which the court did allow limited commitment; the court reversed itself on the very same issue in Kansas v. Crane (2002) imposing much stricter commitment standards and a higher burden of proof. Various state and federal sex offender registry laws impose additional post-conviction requirements for sex offenders.

Known criminals designed as dangerous offenders
 Garry David (Australia)
 Johnson Aziga (Uganda/Canada)
 Paul Bernardo, a.k.a. The Scarborough Rapist/The Schoolgirl Killer (Canada)
 Paul Brumfitt (England)
 Stanley James Tippett (Canada)
 Terry Driver (Canada)
 Thomas Silverstein (United States of America)
 William Chandler Shrubsall, a.k.a. Ian Thor Greene or Simon Templar (United States of America)

References

External links
 Public Safety and Emergency Preparedness Canada: Dangerous offender designation

Welsh law
Canadian criminal law
English criminal law
Law of Denmark